is a stock protagonist of kamishibai during its revival in early Shōwa period Japan. The character and her story is traditionally attributed to a creator known as Seiun, though the plagiarism and retelling in sundry variants that was the norm for popular-proving tales make its true origin uncertain. Generally speaking, the character is a stereotypical adolescent or preadolescent ingénue, a daughter of a penniless family who goes from selling camellias on the streets to being sold or forced to perform in a revue show.

The character is known to western and contemporary Japanese audiences predominantly by way of Suehiro Maruo's ero guro reinterpretation in comics, first in a short story as part of an anthology and then in a full-length graphic novel of the same name (published in English as Mr. Arashi's Amazing Freak Show), and Hiroshi Harada's semi-animated film based on Maruo's version, screened at film festivals and released on DVD-Video with English subtitles as Midori.

The graphic novel is considered a classic of Maruo's 1920s-inspired brand of ero guro and its out-of-print English edition has become much sought-after. Harada's film is also infamous in itself and for the elaborate expanded cinema presentations it was originally only shown in, though it has been allowed to screen in conventional movie theaters and even released on home video outside of Japan. A live-action film adaptation of the manga was released in Japan in May 2016.

Manga

Maruo's manga (as well as its film adaptations) follows the dark misadventures behind the colorful curtains and extravagant performances of the local funfair freak show, hidden away from the audience's smiles and praises. Set in early 20th century Japan in a circus involving freaks such as "Hohichi the Human Pretzel" and "the Human Worm", one member (who is a little girl) has highlighted the misdeeds that occur during these events of the circus camps in her dark and twisted tale.

Characters
 Hanamura Midori the Camellia Girl: An innocent 12-year-old little girl with a bob haircut who enjoyed her life as a student to the fullest. However, everything changed after her father left and her mother died. Midori is forced to drop out of school and sell flowers in the city. The orphaned Midori then meets a stranger who leads her towards the circus. What awaits her will change her life, and her, forever.
 Midori's Father and Mother: Midori's father mysteriously ran away and left his family alone, and Midori's mother was bedridden due to an illness. Her death is horrific as she's eaten by rats and mice.
 Mr. Arashi: The boss of the Amazing Freak Show and the seedy stranger who led Midori into his horrific circus. While he appears to be a benevolent and consistent manager, he is actually a greedy and manipulative conman. He'll do anything to get rich, even going so far as taking Midori hostage for his show. He has no qualms of sleeping with little boys, and he has a fetish of eyeball licking/oculolinctus.
 Tokkuriji Muchisute the Mummy Man: The first circus performer – the disfigured young pervert with missing arms and a face covered in bandages like a mummy; he is one of Japan's victims of leprosy (though he's a burn victim in the other adaptations). Although he has no arms, he is able to use his feet just as if they were hands, performing archery in the circus. He is a stalker who has raped Midori several times.
 Akaza the Giant: The second circus performer – the sword-swallowing, one-eyed strongman with a shaved head and tattoos. He is a laid-back "tough guy" who enjoys eating, money, and having sex with Benitsu. He goes along with the other circus members' sadism and fetishes.
 Benitsu the Snake Woman: The third circus performer – a middle-aged, voluptuous, long-haired, snake-charming woman. She is sadistic and promiscuous. She once tried to solicit sex from Mr. Arashi, but was rejected due to his homosexuality and pedophilia. Despite also taking part in assaulting Midori both violently and sexually, Benitsu would later be the one to defend Midori.
 Kanabun the Boy-Girl: The fourth circus performer – the fire-swallowing psychopath who is characterized by overt cruelty and bloodlust. This sole teenager of the circus is one of the members who caused Midori's attempt to escape the camp after murdering her adopted puppies without her knowledge and serving them as supper to their peers, which Kanabun implied through taunting her. Though Kanabun is dressed as a dollish girl, the bullying sadist once urinated in front of Midori, then flashed their male genitalia at her while wiggling and masturbating in her face just to freak Midori out before raping her, thus revealing that Kanabun is intersex. However, Kanabun is considered a boy by the other circus members as well as Mr. Arashi's sadomasochistic sex slave.
 Masamitsu the Bottled Wonder: The fifth circus performer – the charismatic, middle-aged, chubby dwarf magician. He is a master illusionist, using special magic techniques from the West, and can fit into a small bottle. He also manages the circus. Much like Mr. Arashi, Masamitsu is bent on pedophilia, as he chooses Midori as his helper and acts as her "guardian".

Anime film

 is a 1992 Japanese independent semi-animated ero guro fantasy horror drama film by Hiroshi Harada, based on Suehiro Maruo's comic version of the kamishibai standard.

In 1994, a censored version of the film was produced for future screenings at the request of Eirin, the Japanese film censor board. This version optically censored nudity, sexual assault, and violence towards animals, while removing discriminatory language from the audio track in the form of audio muting. The 2006 Ciné Malta DVD release of the film contains the original 1992 version, albeit with two short sections intended for audiences at live screenings omitted.

For many years, a videotape transfer of the film was all that was known to exist of the film, aside from censored post-1994 film prints screened at various international film festivals. In 2013, the original 16 mm negative of the film was rediscovered in an IMAGICA warehouse. A new print and digital master were made from this negative and began to be screened in digital format in Japan numerous times. Harada's production company plans to release a restored Blu-ray Disc of the new film master in 2020.

Production
The film was single-handedly created by Hiroshi Harada. Given the subject matter, Harada had found it impossible to gain sponsors. He then used his life savings to make the film over a five-year period. Harada hand-drew over 5000 separate sheets of animation.

Screenings
The film was for many years very rare to see at all, as Harada will only screen Midori in Japan if the venue is presented as a carnival freak show. From 1994 to 2006, outside of standard definition videotape transfers of the original master, the film was only available in the form of prints with visual and audio censorship in place. However, in 2006, a region 2-locked PAL-style DVD-Video of the film with subtitles in French, English, Spanish, Italian, and German was released in France by Ciné Malta containing the film's original, uncensored version.

Live-action film
, a live-action film adaptation of the manga directed by Torico and starring  was released in cinemas in Japan on May 21, 2016.

The film was shown in Germany in 2017 at the 18th Japan-Filmfest Hamburg, and it was released on limited edition DVD (limited to 1000 copies in total) with Japanese audio and both German and English subtitles in German-speaking Europe by the distributor Midori-Impuls in 2020.

See also
 GeGeGe no Kitarō – Another manga and anime franchise with its origins in kamishibai.
 Belladonna of Sadness – An earlier erotic Japanese film using still paintings and animation.

References

External links
 Official website of Harada's company, Airtight Lantern Theater Kiryukan 
 Page on the DVD release of Harada's film at Ciné Malta's website
 Fan-run website with information and news on Harada's films  
 AniPages Daily article on Harada's film
 Midnight Eye article on Harada's film
 
 
 
 Live-action film official website 
 

1992 anime films
Animated films based on manga
Child characters in anime and manga
Ero guro
Fictional circus performers
Fictional Japanese people
Fictional slaves
Folklore characters
Historical anime and manga
Live-action films based on manga
Manga adapted into films
Performing arts in Japan
Shōwa period
Suehiro Maruo
Japanese animated horror films
Anime and manga controversies
Film controversies
Obscenity controversies in animation
Obscenity controversies in film
Obscenity controversies in comics
Controversies in Japan
Censored films
Fiction about animal cruelty
Japanese fantasy drama films
Japanese avant-garde and experimental films